The 2008 Saginaw Sting season was the first season for the American Continental Indoor Football League franchise, who began play as an expansion team. Original team owners were Mike Johnson, Mike Trumbull, and Esteban Rivera, who also owned the Kalamazoo Xplosion. The team was led by former Michigan State quarterback Damon Dowdell, who led the league in passing yards (2,190), touchdowns (54) and completion percentage (62%). Nick Body was Dowdell's favorite target, leading the league in receptions (78), yards (1,005) and touchdowns (31). Despite their offensive numbers, neither player won Offensive Player of the Year or the CIFL MVP. The duo led the Sting to a 10–2 regular season and a playoff berth. On June 29, 2008, the Sting defeated the Xplosion 41–37 to win the CIFL Championship Game.

Schedule

Standings

Roster

References

2008 Continental Indoor Football League season
Saginaw Sting
Saginaw Sting